"Ten Miles" is a song by the Danish pop band Infernal. It was released in 2006 as the second single from the international edition of From Paris to Berlin, and as the sixth single overall. The song became a moderate success in the dance music charts in Denmark, Spain and Finland. In Spain it peaked at #26 and in Denmark at #3 in the Danish Dance Chart. In April 2006, "Ten Miles" debuted in the French Airplay Chart at #84.

In September 2007 at Infernal's official UK website, they stated that their fourth UK single would be "Ten Miles" and the music video was released, receiving as of July 2008 over 1 million views on YouTube. It gradually became an unexpected hit for the duo - passing the peak of their previous single "I Won't Be Crying" in Europe, even though there was no physical release for the song.

The song has been certified Platinum in Denmark.

Track listing
CD promo single
"Ten Miles" (Original Version) — 3:30
"Ten Miles" (Weekend Wonderz Remix) — 7:21

CD single
"Ten Miles" (Original Version) — 3:30
"Ten Miles" (N-Joy Remix) — 4:18
"Ten Miles" (Weekend Wonderz Mix) — 7:21
"Ten Miles" (Jack To Life Mix) — 6:28
"Ten Miles" (Spank! @ The High Mile Club Mix) — 5:29

Digital download
"Ten Miles" (Original Version) — 3:32
"Ten Miles" (Weekend Wonderz Mix) — 7:23
"Ten Miles" (Jack To Life Mix) — 6:30
"Ten Miles" (Spank! @ The High Mile Club Mix) — 5:29

Credits and personnel
Written by Paw Lagermann, Lina Rafn, Morgan Jalsing, Nicole Stockholm, Moses Malone
Produced, arranged and mixed by Infernal at Infernal Studio
Vocals recorded by Infernal
Additional vocals by Anne Rani
Guitar by Jimmy Dee
"Ten Miles" (N-Joy Remix): remix by Darwich at Studio Panic
"Ten Miles" (Weekend Wonderz Mix): remix by Daniel Kandi and Fritz Niko for K-Flozz Production
"Ten Miles" (Jack To Life Mix): remix by Henrik Hjarnø and Søren Lorenzen. Additional engineering and mix by Nils Harbo. Mixed at TechPoint Studio
"Ten Miles" (Spank! @ The High Mile Club Mix): remix by Paw Lagermann and Jesper Green at Infernal Studio
A&R by Jesper Green & Michael Guldhammer
Mastered by Nikolaj Vinten at Medley Mastering & Jan Eliasson at Audio Planet
Design and artwork by enrico.andreis.dk
Photography by Steen Trolle
Management by AHM, Alex Futtrup

Charts

References

Infernal (Danish band) songs
2006 singles
2007 singles
Songs written by Paw Lagermann
Songs written by Lina Rafn
2006 songs